Olugbenga Enitan Temitope Akinnagbe (born 12 December 1978) is an American actor and writer, best known for his roles as Chris Partlow on the HBO series The Wire and as Larry Brown on the HBO series The Deuce.

Early life 
Akinnagbe was born in Washington, D.C., the son of Yoruba Nigerian parents, and was raised in Silver Spring, Maryland. He is the second oldest of six children, with one older sister and four younger brothers, and the first in his family to be born in the United States. He attended Colonel Zadok A. Magruder High School in Rockville, Maryland. He attended Bucknell University on a wrestling scholarship, and graduated in 2000 with a degree in Political Science and English. Akinnagbe's cousin is rapper Wale.

Career 
Akinnagbe played Ben Ellis in the episode "Contenders" on the TV series Numb3rs. In the summer of 2006, Akinnagbe performed the role of "Zim" in the NYC Fringe Festival's "Outstanding Play" award-winning production of Modern Missionary. In 2003, Akinnagbe auditioned for the role of Chris Partlow on the HBO series The Wire and starting in 2004 began a frequent recurring role. In 2008 during the show's fifth and final season, he was promoted to a series regular.

In 2007, Akinnagbe appeared in the film The Savages with Philip Seymour Hoffman, Laura Linney, and Philip Bosco. He appeared in the remake of The Taking of Pelham One Two Three, which was released by Sony in June 2009. Akinnagbe made a guest appearance on a season 10 Law & Order: Special Victims Unit episode entitled "Hell" as Elijah Okello, a former Ugandan child soldier living in New York, facing deportation. Akinnagbe's former The Wire castmate Robert Wisdom also appeared in that episode as Father Theo Burdett. In 2010 in Seattle, Washington Akinnagbe starred in the world premiere play The Thin Place at The Intiman Theatre. 

He was in the movie Lottery Ticket and appeared on The Good Wife as Pastor Isiah Easton. His former co-star from The Wire, Frankie Faison, portrayed his father on The Good Wife in several episodes. He also appeared as Kelly Slater, a nurse in the third season of the Showtime series Nurse Jackie. 

He starred in leading roles in two independent films, as Jack in Home, directed by Jono Oliver, and as James in Big Words, directed by Neil Drumming. He appeared as a drug lord in the USA series Graceland and starred as Tom in The Following. He also starred as CIA Agent Erik Ritter in 24: Live Another Day. In October 2016 he began shooting the feature film Starbright.

In March 2020, Akinnagbe was cast in The Old Man.

Personal life 
Gbenga has had two articles published in The New York Times, one detailing a trip to Nepal to climb the Himalayas, and the other outlining the medical procedures he underwent to correct his severely flat feet.

On July 19, 2021, it was reported that Akinnagbe filed a criminal complaint alleging that a female journalist had grabbed his buttocks on two occasions in 2020. According to reports, the journalist was arrested, jailed and charged with forcible touching, sexual abuse and harassment. The journalist's attorney described Akinnagbe's allegations as "a blatant, brazen lie". In October 2021, the case was dismissed.

Filmography

Film

Television

Theater

References

External links
 
 
 Gbenga Akinnagbe interview on HoboTrashcan.com
  Gbenga bio from HBO's The Wire Website
 Insomniac Magazine Interview by Dirty Angel November 17, 2006, Retrieved February 26, 2007
 Gbenga Akinnagbe NY Times article 9/27/2009 "In Nepal, a Long, Cold Climb to Inspiration"
 Gbenga Akinnagbe NY Times article 5/3/2010 "My Left Foot: The High Cost of Fallen Arches"
Gbenga Akinnagbe NY Post article "'The Wire' actor alleges sexual abuse by journalist, who calls contact consensual"
Gbenga Akinnagbe NY Daily News article "'The Wire' actor accuses NYC journalist of groping him - she says it happened during consensual relationship"

21st-century American male actors
American male film actors
American male sport wrestlers
American people of Nigerian descent
Male actors from Washington, D.C.
People from Rockville, Maryland
Living people
American people of Yoruba descent
Yoruba male actors
People from Silver Spring, Maryland
Bucknell University alumni
American male television actors
Male actors from Maryland
Theatre World Award winners
1978 births